Events in the year 1904 in Iceland.

Incumbents 
 Monarch: Christian IX
 Prime Minister: Hannes Þórður Pétursson Hafstein

Events 

 The position of Prime Minister of Iceland is established with Hannes Þórður Pétursson Hafstein of the Home Rule Party taking the position on 1 February.
 The oldest building at the Akureyri Junior College is constructed.

References 

 
1900s in Iceland
Years of the 20th century in Iceland
Iceland
Iceland